Love Me Tender is a Christer Sjögren album, released 15 February 2005, consisting of recordings of songs who had earlier been recorded by Elvis Presley.

Track listing
Love Me Tender
Don't Be Cruel
One Night with You
Always on My Mind
Good Luck Charm
Can't Help Falling in Love
Surrender     
You Don't Have to Say You Love Me
In the Ghetto
The Wonder of You
Return to Sender
Young and Beautiful
Are You Lonesome Tonight?
She's Not You
Crying in the Chapel
Devil in Disguise
I Want You, I Need You, I Love You
Suspicious Minds

Contributors
Christer Sjögren - vocals
Lennart Sjöholm - producer
Per Lindwall - drums
Rutger Gunnarsson - bass
Lasse Wellander - guitar
Peter Ljung - piano, keyboard

Charts

Weekly charts

Year-end charts

Certifications

References

2005 albums
Christer Sjögren albums